Itagüí is a city and municipality of Colombia, located in the south of the Aburrá Valley in the Antioquia Department. It is part of The Metropolitan Area of the Aburrá Valley.

Demographics

The population at the 2005 census was 230,272 on an area of 17 km2.

History
Founded in 1743, Itagüí was declared a municipality in 1832.  Its name comes some historians of an indigenous chief named Bitagüí. Two of its most representative Diego Echavarría Misas and Eladio Vélez.

There were two chapels in Itagüí in colonial times. One in the place of the Tablaza that had been owned by Bruno Saldarriaga, built thanks to the permission that the Bishop of Popayán Francisco José de Figueredo granted December 19, 1743. Francisco Riaza and Bruno Saldarriaga who Lot more to the small temple, gave an extension of thirty blocks for the drawing of a population. This chapel was what later came to be elevated to the status of parish.

In 1774, the priest of Medellin Juan Salvador de Villa called for the creation of four parishes: Medellin, Bello, Envigado and Itagüí. On 29 April 1825 party Itagüí neighbors gave Mr. Joaquín Vélez Velasquez to represent them before the civil and ecclesiastical governments to achieve this party was elevated to parish district. Then took office as the first bishop of Antioch Mariano Orjuela Garnica and the attorney raised the request, but Monsignor Garnica said I should go first to the civil authority, i.e., the governor of the province. This was done, but the governor, Gregorio Maria Urreta was adverse and so reported in a communication of 13 January 1829.

In 1832 he founded the first primary school was given by Don Manuel Antonio Piedrahita for several years. It was private and only in 1871 was established on the record. The March 26, 1876 was inaugurated Itagüi Telegraph. This was announced Mayor Joseph M. Ruiz when he led the first telegraph message to President Don Reccared state of Villa.

In 1931 is constructed the first aqueduct Municipal. In 1945 it was officially inaugurated on May 13 Itagüi Library, built by philanthropist Diego Echavarría Misas. In 1962 he began building the first City Hall. In 1967 the renowned painter of Itagüí Eladio Vélez dies. In 1993 was inaugurated the Administrative Center Municipal of Itagüí (CAMI) and the Estadio Metropolitano City of Itagüí. In 2006 Itagüí and Medellin limits defined industry sector or fraction called Bethlehem.

Etymology

The territory of the present Itagüí was, along with those of Envigado and Sabaneta, a territory inhabited by Nutabes, indigenous tribe which some historians and researchers are classified within the Chibcha language family. The town was inhabited from the early days of the sixteenth century.

Some historians that the name comes from the indigenous chief "Bitagüí", apparently his tribe inhabited this territory, although this may be just a legend. Initially Bitagüí site belonged to different owners, many of whom lived in Medellin. However, later, was inhabited by people who had ties to the founding families of "the Villa" (Medellin).

Geography

Itagüi is located south of the Aburrá Valley, a valley in the Andes, has an area of 17 km2, making it the third smallest municipality in Colombia. The municipality is fully urbanized in the flat.

Itagüi has a relief with inconsiderable heights belonging to the Central Cordillera. The heights are: High Manzanillo and the hills of Three Sweet Names and El Cacique
The main stream is the Medellín River, which forms the border with the municipalities of Envigado and Sabaneta. The most important tributary of the river, in the town, is the creek Dona Maria Itagüi walking from west to east.

Economy

Itagüí has a favorable tax rate compared to the surrounding Antioquia Department in having a higher tax collection; which has resulted in the development of major infrastructure in the last 10 years, making it one of Colombia's most important economic engines. Itagüí became the site of Colombia's first motorcycle assembly plant when Auteco opened a factory there in 1962. It also has the presence of other big companies like Carrefour, which has worldwide recognition as Walmart.

A large distillery, FLA, has operated for a century manufacturing rums, liqueurs, aguardientes and other distilled beverages.

The city has the Municipal Administrative Center Itagüí (CAMI), which holds the government and regulating the economy and politics of the city. The CAMI is an urban complex that performs the functions of the local town hall in the subregion Itagui Aburrá Valley in the department of Antioquia in Colombia.

Political structure - administrative

Itagüí is governed by a democratic system based on administrative decentralization processes generated from the proclamation of the Colombian Constitution of 1991. The city is governed by a mayor (executive) and a Municipal Council (legislative power).

Itagüí Mayor is the head of government and municipal administration, representing legal, judicial and extra to the municipality. It is a position elected by popular vote for a four-year period, which currently is held by León Mario Bedoya López for the period 2012–2015. Among its main functions is the administration of the resources of the municipality, to ensure the welfare and interests of their fellow citizens and represent them in the national government, while supporting local policies to improve their quality of life, such as health programs, housing, education and road infrastructure and maintain public order.

The council is a public corporation Itagüí popular vote, made up of 19 councilors from different political, democratically elected for a four. The council is the legislative body of the municipality issued mandatory arrangements within its territorial jurisdiction. Its functions include the mayor approving projects, determine the structure of local government and the functions of its dependencies, issue budget organic standards and issue annual budget of revenues and expenditures.

To manage the municipality, the Mayor has 12 departments, 3-way and 4 advisory offices:

Administrative division

Itagüí is composed of the county seat, divided into 64 districts organized into six districts, and a township called Manzanillo consisted of 8 paths.

Itagüí bordered to the north the city of Medellin, creating a conurbation that currently is unclear, since both municipalities are in border disputes.
The communes and districts are:

Metropolitan Area of the Aburrá Valley

The Metropolitan Area of the Aburrá Valley is a political entity administrative sits throughout the Aburrá Valley at an average altitude of 1,538 m.

The area consists of 10 municipalities, and is crossed from south to north by the Medellín river which, being born south of it in the town of Caldas, and in the north, in the town of Barbosa, takes the name of Rio Porce.

It was the first metropolitan area created in Colombia in 1980, and is the second metropolitan area population in the country after the Capital District of Bogotá. The total population, which adds the urban and rural population of the ten cities is of 3.312.165 inhabitants.

The main urban area of the Metropolitan Area of the Aburrá Valley is located in the center of the valley and consists of the four largest cities by population: Medellín, Bello, Itagüí and Envigado.

Culture

Although the town has been known Itagüí in the national as a locality with a strong industrial and commercial vocation, it would still be a major cultural center of the Aburrá Valley and the Antioquia department. Itagüí shown to have important exponents of the art, in painting with Eladio Vélez, in writing, the poet Carlos Enrique Sierra and sculpture find Salvador Arango . Eladio Vélez On behalf of the School of Art this Eladio Vélez Art School Itagüí a historic place in providing artistic alternatives for citizens.

The rich cultural treasures customs of a population cheerful, hardworking, with a high degree of religiousness and the strength of its own that since ancient characterizes Antioquia department. The main cultural precinct Itagüí is the House of Culture of Itagüí Diego Echavarría Misas. Recently opened Museum Graciliano Arcila Vélez, located in a historic district for Itagüí, rosary, as this is found indigenous parts of the tribes that inhabited this territory. Itagüí has the South Auditorium which hosts various events, among them the Festival Theatre Itagüi City.

Famous People
Camilo Monroy (1998)

Festivals and events

 The Festival of Industry, Trade and Culture lasts eight days, ending with the World Day of Laziness. Both were started in Itagüí.
 Theatre Festival City Itagüí
 Poetry Festival Park
 October event, Our Lady of the Rosary
 Party of New Year

Transportation
It has two metro stations that link it directly to Medellín and other municipalities. It has a vast "colectivo" (micro-bus) and bus system which conforms with the needs of the city.

Gallery

Security

Itagüí is also the place where the Itagüí Maximum Security prison is located. Itagüí security model is considered in Colombia. With one of the best control strategies cops and criminal gangs.

Sports

Itagüí is home to a football (soccer) team called Itagüí F.C. which plays in the Colombian first division. The team plays in the Metropolitan Stadium City Itagüí (in Spanish Estadio Metropolitano Ciudad de Itagüí). The city also has an Itagüí Coliseum where soccer practice.

In 2010 Itagüí F.C. team for most of the season was leader, played in the Colombia Cup to reach the final after beating in the direct elimination rounds favorite team Deportes Tolima, Atletico Nacional and Millonarios, these in last two kicks from the penalty mark. In the final, Itagüí falls into the hands of Deportivo Cali with local results 0-1 and 2-0 on the road.

In Futsal the city also has participation and is housed in the Coliseum of Itagüí. The Itagüí of Futsal was the champion of the first half of 2012. The Itagüí of Futsal is the representative team Itagüí City in the League Argos, involving 12 teams from major cities. Itagüí is to become a benchmark of futsal in the country and a major player in the tournament since the beginning of it.

See also

 Municipal Administrative Center Itagüí (CAMI)
 Colombia

References

External links
 Itagüí official website

 
Municipalities of Antioquia Department
The Metropolitan Area of the Aburrá Valley
Populated places established in 1775
1770s establishments in the Viceroyalty of New Granada
1775 establishments in South America